Zalegoshchensky District is an administrative and municipal district (raion), one of the twenty-four in Oryol Oblast, Russia. It is located in the center of the oblast. Its administrative center is the urban locality (an urban-type settlement) of Zalegoshch. Population: 15,376 (2010 Census);  The population of Zalegoshch accounts for 34.7% of the district's total population.

Notable residents 

Georgy Parshin (1916–1956), pilot, twice awarded Hero of the Soviet Union

See also
Ivan (village)

References

Notes

Sources

Districts of Oryol Oblast